Kasper Dolberg Rasmussen (born 6 October 1997) is a Danish professional footballer who plays as a forward for Bundesliga club 1899 Hoffenheim, on loan from Nice. He also represents the Denmark national team.

Dolberg made his senior debut at Silkeborg IF in May 2015. He joined Ajax in July 2015 and made his debut for the club in July 2016. He represented Denmark at under-16, under-17, under-19 and under-21 level before making his senior international debut in November 2016.

In May 2020, Dolberg was voted as player of the year by the fans of his club OGC Nice. While at Ajax, he was named Dutch Football Talent of the year after his first season in the Eredivisie in 2017.

Club career

Silkeborg IF
On 17 May 2015, he made his senior debut for Silkeborg IF in a Danish Superliga game against Brøndby IF, replacing Adeola Lanre Runsewe after 63 minutes in a 0-2 loss.

Ajax

On 5 January 2015, Ajax announced that 17-year-old Dolberg would join from Silkeborg IF in the summer, signing a three-year contract valid from summer 2015 until summer 2018. He had been spotted by Danish scout John Steen Olsen, the same scout who discovered players such as Zlatan Ibrahimović, Viktor Fischer, and Christian Eriksen for the Dutch capital club. On 13 May 2016, Dolberg agreed to have his contract extended until 2021.

On 26 July 2016, Dolberg scored his first goal in European competition on his competitive debut for Ajax, in a 1–1 Champions League qualification match against PAOK. He made his Eredivisie debut for the club on 7 August 2016 in a match against Sparta Rotterdam, coming on as a substitute for Mateo Cassierra. The following week he was in the starting line-up for the league match against Roda JC and he scored both of Ajax's goals in the 2–2 draw, his first goals in the Eredivisie. On 29 September 2016, Dolberg scored the only goal in a 1–0 victory over Standard Liège in a Europa League match. He scored another goal in his first Klassieker against Ajax's great rival Feyenoord on 23 October 2016, securing a 1–1 draw away in Rotterdam. On 20 November 2016, he scored a first-half hat-trick in an Eredivisie match against NEC. This made him the youngest non-Dutch player ever to score a hattrick for Ajax. On 9 March 2017, Dolberg scored the equalizer in what ended in a 2–1 loss to F.C. Copenhagen in the round of 16 of the 2016–17 UEFA Europa League campaign, thus ending a club record eight-month period in which Copenhagen had not conceded any goals at their home ground at Parken Stadium since 20 August 2016.

OGC Nice
Dolberg signed for Nice in Ligue 1 on 29 August 2019 for a fee of 20.5 million euros. He finished his first season in France as the club's top scorer with 11 goals and was named the club's player of the season, as Nice finished in fifth place, securing a spot in the group stage for next season's UEFA Europa League.

Dolberg started the 2020–21 season with a brace on 29 August 2020 against Strasbourg, securing his team a 2–0 away win.

International career
In November 2016, Dolberg received his first call-up to the senior Denmark squad for matches against Kazakhstan and Czech Republic. On 11 November 2016, he made his senior international debut, coming on as a second-half substitute in a 4–1 victory for Denmark over Kazakhstan. On 10 June 2017, in a 1–3 away win against Kazakhstan in the qualifiers for the 2018 World Cup, he came on as a substitute for Yussuf Poulsen after 68 minutes and scored his first international goal in the 81st minute.

In June 2018 he was named in Denmark's squad for the 2018 FIFA World Cup in Russia.

In May 2021, he was selected in the final 26-man squad for the postponed UEFA Euro 2020 tournament. Dolberg made his first start in the tournament, replacing the injured Yussuf Poulsen, in Denmark's round of 16 tie against Wales on 26 June and scored twice in a 4–0 win. He scored his third goal of the tournament in the quarter-finals against Czech Republic after a spectacular cross from Joakim Mæhle.

Personal life
On 16 September 2019, Dolberg reported to the police that his luxury watch at an estimated value of €70,000 was stolen. Following a police investigation, in which the police recovered a surveillance video showing the culprit stealing the watch, his teammate Lamine Diaby-Fadiga confessed to the crime ten days later. Diaby was later sacked by the club.

On 8 November 2021, Dolberg announced that he had been diagnosed with Type 1 diabetes.

Career statistics

Club

International

As of match played 25 September 2022. Denmark score listed first, score column indicates score after each Dolberg goal.

Honours
Ajax
 Eredivisie: 2018–19
 KNVB Cup: 2018–19
 Johan Cruyff Shield: 2019
 UEFA Europa League runner-up: 2016–17

Nice
 Coupe de France runner-up: 2021–22

Individual
Danish Talent of the Year: 2016
Ajax Talent of the Year (Marco van Basten Award): 2017
Johan Cruyff Trophy: 2016–17
OGC Nice Player of the Season: 2019–20

References

External links

 
 
 Kasper Dolberg at the Danish Football Association
 

1997 births
Living people
People from Silkeborg
Association football forwards
Danish men's footballers
Denmark international footballers
Denmark under-21 international footballers
Denmark youth international footballers
Silkeborg IF players
AFC Ajax players
OGC Nice players
Sevilla FC players
TSG 1899 Hoffenheim players 
Danish Superliga players
Eredivisie players
Ligue 1 players
La Liga players
Bundesliga players
2018 FIFA World Cup players
UEFA Euro 2020 players
2022 FIFA World Cup players
Danish expatriate men's footballers
Danish expatriate sportspeople in the Netherlands
Expatriate footballers in the Netherlands
Danish expatriate sportspeople in France
Expatriate footballers in France
Expatriate footballers in Spain
Expatriate footballers in Germany
Sportspeople from the Central Denmark Region